Phalacra perspicaria is a moth in the family Drepanidae. It was described by Johan Christian Fabricius in 1798. It is found in India.

The protologue (species description) of Phalaena perspicaria by Fabricius is in Entomologia systematica emandata et aucta. Supplementum Entomologiae Systematicae 1798; page 449, where it says (in Latin):

At the Global Lepidoptera Names Index, P. perspicaria is suspected to be a senior synonym of Phalacra vidhisaria Walker; in that case the name perspicaria is older and has a preference.

The type location is the town of Tharangambadi on the Coromandel Coast of Tamil Nadu, India.

References

Moths described in 1798
Drepaninae
Moths of Asia
Taxa named by Johan Christian Fabricius